Casa Italiana Zerilli-Marimò, located at 24 West 12th Street in Manhattan, is the home of the Department of Italian Studies at New York University.

History
Casa Italiana Zerilli-Marimò was founded in 1990 thanks to a donation from the Baroness Mariuccia Zerilli-Marimò, in memory of her husband Guido Zerilli-Marimò.

The donation consisted of the purchase and complete restoration of the 19th century household in the Greenwich Village, situated near Washington Square.

Mission
Casa Italiana Zerilli-Marimò was founded with the specific intent of spreading Italian culture outside of its national boundaries. The Center offers cultural events pertinent to Italian culture, including art exhibits, concerts, lectures, film screenings, literary presentations and awards. The ground floor serves as an art gallery.

The programs of Casa Italiana deal with literature, cinema and political and social reflection.

Casa Italiana Zerilli-Marimò houses and involves itself with Italian artists, scholars and politicians, whose presence engages new points of discussion, opening and encouraging dialog with Americans on Italian life and culture.

Casa Italiana collaborates with Italian centers and institutes, both public and private, developing a program of extra-curricular cultural events, embracing literary, musical and artistic events.

Directors
 Professor Luigi Ballarini (1990–1993)
 Professor James Ziskin (1993–1998)
 Professor Stefano Albertini (1998–today)

See also
 The Zerilli-Marimò Prize for Italian Fiction
 Villa La Pietra

External links
 
 The Department of Italian Studies at New York University

New York University
University art museums and galleries in New York City